Timothy Reginald Newton (born March 23, 1963) is an American former college and professional football player who was a defensive tackle in the National Football League (NFL) for nine seasons during the 1980s and 1990s.  Newton played college football for the University of Florida, and thereafter, he played professionally for the Minnesota Vikings, Tampa Bay Buccaneers and Kansas City Chiefs of the NFL.

Early years 

Newton was born in Orlando, Florida in 1963.  He attended Jones High School in Orlando, and played for the Jones Tigers high school football team.

College career 

Newton accepted an athletic scholarship to attend the University of Florida in Gainesville, Florida, where he played for coach Charley Pell and coach Galen Hall's Florida Gators football teams from 1981 to 1984.  As a senior in 1984, Newton was a first-team All-Southeastern Conference (SEC) selection and a second-team All-American.

Professional career 

In his nine-season NFL career, Newton played in a total of 108 regular season games, and started forty-seven of them.

Football family 

He is the younger brother of Nate Newton, who also played in the NFL.

See also 

 Florida Gators football, 1980–89
 History of the Minnesota Vikings
 List of Florida Gators football All-Americans
 List of Florida Gators in the NFL Draft
 List of Kansas City Chiefs players

References

Bibliography 

 Carlson, Norm, University of Florida Football Vault: The History of the Florida Gators, Whitman Publishing, LLC, Atlanta, Georgia (2007).  .
 Golenbock, Peter, Go Gators!  An Oral History of Florida's Pursuit of Gridiron Glory, Legends Publishing, LLC, St. Petersburg, Florida (2002).  .
 Hairston, Jack, Tales from the Gator Swamp: A Collection of the Greatest Gator Stories Ever Told, Sports Publishing, LLC, Champaign, Illinois (2002).  .
 McCarthy, Kevin M.,  Fightin' Gators: A History of University of Florida Football, Arcadia Publishing, Mount Pleasant, South Carolina (2000).  .
 Nash, Noel, ed., The Gainesville Sun Presents The Greatest Moments in Florida Gators Football, Sports Publishing, Inc., Champaign, Illinois (1998).  .

1963 births
Living people
Jones High School (Orlando, Florida) alumni
Players of American football from Orlando, Florida
American football defensive tackles
Florida Gators football players
Minnesota Vikings players
Tampa Bay Buccaneers players
Kansas City Chiefs players